We Are the Union is an American ska punk band from Ann Arbor, Michigan formed in 2005. The band is now based out of Michigan, California and Florida. The band has had numerous lineup changes since its inception, with vocalist/guitarist Reade Wolcott and bassist Brandon Benson as the only remaining original members. As of 2022, their live lineup often features guest horn players and touring members.

History

Early years and hiatus (2005–2013)
The band formed in August 2005 in Ann Arbor, Michigan due to members being "unhappy with the current state of ska music." Their debut album, Who We Are, was released in 2007.

Who We Are would be followed by albums Great Leaps Forward in 2010 and You Can't Hide the Sun in 2012.  In 2013, We Are the Union announced they were going on an indefinite hiatus, stating: "We've decided to take a hiatus from active status. […] We were a band. Maybe someday we will be again. We've had some amazing times, and we truly appreciate those of you who've contributed to our existence. We've never been a supercool hype band or uberpunx beardy band, so we thank each and every one of you who listened to our music over the years."

Return, Self Care, and Ordinary Life (2015–present)
The band returned from hiatus in 2015, with Jer Hunter of the YouTube channel Ska Tune Network joining the band on trombone. They released their fourth studio album, Self Care, in 2018. Following this album release, the band appeared on Audiotree, and released new singles in 2020.

In April 2021, We Are The Union announced a new album, Ordinary Life, to be released on June 4, 2021 via Bad Time Records. Along with the album announcement, lead vocalist Reade Wolcott came out as a trans woman, with much of the album exploring topics surrounding her transition.

In The Summer of Ska 2022, We Are the Union became the "Official Band of Pride." In November 2022, drummer Brent Friedman left the band.

Influences and musical style
We Are the Union cites Lifetime, Kid Dynamite, Slapstick, Less Than Jake, and This Is A Standoff as influences. More recently, they have been influenced by indie pop and pop music.

Band members

Current members
 Reade Wolcott – guitar, lead vocals 
 Brandon Benson – bass, backing vocals 
 Ricky Weber – lead guitar 
 Jer Hunter – trombone, backing vocals 
 Emily Williams - tenor saxophone (2022-present)

Former members 
 Brent Friedman – drums 
 Jim Margle – drums
 Charlie Held – drums
 Matt Belanger – trombone
 Trey Cook – drums
 Tony Weinbender – unknown, possibly trombone
 John Ryan Jr. – saxophone
 David Lackey – trombone
 Barney – trombone
 Daniel Ray – trombone
 Ryan Collins- guitar
 Noah Fenton- guitar
 Ben Wixson – guitar
 Denni Skagalera- tenor saxophone (touring member)

Discography
Adapted from Bandcamp, Spotify, Tumblr and YouTube

Studio albums 
 Who We Are (2007)
 Great Leaps Forward (2010)
 You Can't Hide The Sun (2012)
 Self Care (2018)
 Ordinary Life (2021)

Extended plays 
 The Grow Up Or Shut Up EP (2006, out of print)
 The Gun Show Must Go On (2009, digital only)
 Graveyard Grins (2011, digital only)
 You Can't B-Side The Sun (2014)
 Keep It Down (2015)

Singles

As lead artist

As featured artist

Demos 
 The Grow Up Or Shut Up EP (2006, out of print)

Live albums

YouTube releases
 Dust on the Hourglass (Acoustic In-Studio) (2018)

Music videos 
 This is My Life (And It's Ending One Minute At A Time) (2008)
 We're Gonna Need A Bigger Boat (2012)
 Call In Dead (Lyric Video, 2015)
 A Better Home (Lyric Video, 2018)
 Dust on the Hourglass (Acoustic In-Studio) (2018)
 What's Wrong With Me? (Lyric Video, 2018)
 Your Way, Your Time (2020)
 Pre-Expatriate (2020)
 You're Dead / Vampire Ska (2020)
 I'm Working Retail For Christmas (2020)
 Morbid Obsessions (2021)
 Boys Will Be Girls (2021)
 Make It Easy (2021)

Compilation appearances
 Fall Sampler 2012 (2012, Paper and Plastick Records)
 Features the track "Dead End" from You Can't Hide The Sun
 2013 Summer Sampler (2013, Paper and Plastick Records)
 Features the track "Dust on the Hourglass" also from You Can't Hide The Sun

References

External links
 
 We Are the Union discography at MusicBrainz

American ska punk musical groups
Musical groups from Detroit
American pop punk groups
Post–third wave ska groups
American ska musical groups